Mecúfi District is a district of Cabo Delgado Province in northern Mozambique. It covers 1,254 km2 with 48,503 inhabitants.

External links
Government profile 

Districts in Cabo Delgado Province